SIIMA Award for Best Supporting Actress – Telugu is presented by Vibri media group as part of its annual South Indian International Movie Awards, for the best acting done by an actor in a supporting role in Telugu films. The award was first given in 2013 for films released in 2012. Jayasudha is the most nominated with 5 nominations and Anasuya Bharadwaj most awarded with 2 times winning the award.

Superlatives

Winners

Nominations 

 2012: Saloni Aswani – Bodyguard
 Sindhu Tolani – Ishq
 Suhasini Maniratnam – Gabbar Singh
 Amala – Life Is Beautiful
 Bhanupriya – Dhammu
 2013: Lakshmi Manchu – Gundello Godari
 Anjali – Seethamma Vakitlo Sirimalle Chettu
 Jayasudha – Seethamma Vakitlo Sirimalle Chettu
 Nadhiya Moidu – Attarintiki Daredi
 Andrea Jeremiah – Tadakha
 2014: Shriya Saran – Manam
 Nadhiya Moidu – Drushyam
 Jayasudha – Yevadu
 Sujata Kumar  – Legend
 Lakshmi Manchu – Chandamama Kathalu
 2015: Ramya Krishna – Baahubali: The Beginning
 Nithya Menen – Rudramadevi
 Kriti Kharbanda – Bruce Lee - The Fighter
 Pavitra Lokesh – Malli Malli Idi Rani Roju
 Sneha – S/O Satyamurthy
 2016: Anasuya – Kshanam
 Anupama Parameswaran – Premam
 Jayasudha – Oopiri
 Nadiya Moidu – A Aa
 Ramya Krishna – Soggade Chinni Nayana
 2017: Bhoomika Chawla – Middle Class Abbayi
 Hema Malini – Gautamiputra Satakarni
 Jayasudha – Sathamanam Bhavati
 Raadhika Sarathkumar – Raja The Great
 Ramya Krishna – Baahubali 2: The Conclusion
 2018: Anasuya – Rangasthalam
 Asha Sarath – Bhaagamathie
 Jayasudha – Srinivasa Kalyanam
 Ramya Krishna – Sailaja Reddy Alludu
 Supriya – Goodachari
 2019: Lakshmi – Oh! Baby
 Nivetha Pethuraj – Chitralahari
 Mirnalini Ravi – Gaddalakonda Ganesh
 Jhansi – Mallesham
 Ananya Agarwal – Majili
 2020: Tabu – Ala Vaikunthapurramuloo
Vijayashanti – Sarileru Neekevvaru
Anjali – Nishabdham
Sargun Kaur Luthra – Aswathama
Gouri G. Kishan – Jaanu
2021: Varalaxmi Sarathkumar – Krack
 Ramya Krishna – Republic
 Nivetha Thomas – Vakeel Saab
 Poorna – Akhanda
 Nivetha Pethuraj – Red

See also 

 Tollywood

References 

South Indian International Movie Awards
South Indian International Movie Awards winners